The Funivia di San Marino (in English: "Ropeway") is an aerial cable car in San Marino. The cable car runs from a lower terminus in Borgo Maggiore to the upper station in the City of San Marino.

Established in 1959 and modernized twice, the first in the 1990s and the second in 2017, it is one of the most used means of transport to reach the capital, especially by tourists and workers. It is managed by the State Company for Public Services.

Technical data
 Length: 338 m
 Difference in altitude: 166 m
 Speed: 6 m/s
 Maximum capacity: 50 + 1 people per cabin
 Maximum capacity: 1,200 people per hour
 Traction power: 180 kW

See also
San Marino
Aerial cable car 
State Company for Public Services.

References

External links
 

1959 establishments in San Marino
Transport infrastructure completed in 1959
Aerial tramways
Transport in San Marino
Borgo Maggiore
Buildings and structures in the City of San Marino